Pathway to Deviance is the fifth album by death metal band Desecration.

Track listing
 "Cleaver, Saw and Butcher's Knife"
 "Offer The Flesh"
 "King of the Missing"
 "Bloody Human Carvery"
 "None of us are Saints"
 "Let's Have A Hanging"
 "Swollen"
 "Bathroom Autopsy"
 "They Bled"
 "Frosted Breath"

Reviews
Pathway to Deviance received a rating of 4.3/5 at Metal Ireland

2002 albums
Desecration (band) albums